Chilakkottudu is a 1997 Indian Telugu-language comedy film, produced by M. Balaji Nagalingam under the Sai Krupa Productions banner and directed by E. V. V. Satyanarayana. The film stars Jagapati Babu, Rajendra Prasad, Madhubala, Gautami, Kasthuri, Indraja, and  music composed by Koti. The film was a remake of the Malayalam film Boeing Boeing.

Plot
The film begins with Jagapati a tomcat who holds a photo studio jointly with his best friend Prasad. Once he rolls to a photo section for a cute girl, Indraja daughter of a factionist Kadapa Kota whom he entices. Afterward, Jagapati goes on to Bombay where he attracts another beauty Bombay Papa. Soon at his arrival he dashes 3 air hostesses Madhu, Gautami, & Kasturi at an airport and is covetous of them. Hence, Prasad makes his acquaintance with trafficker Brahmanandam. The two counterfeit Jagapati as a tycoon and entraps the three. Presently, they rent a villa of a drunkard AVS without his knowledge by handling the watchman Relangi Ramana Reddy. Now that Jagapati starts his game the 3 air hostesses become frequenters of the house. Jagapati & Prasad plays hide & seek by keeping them in 3 different rooms which end hilariously.

Besides Kadapa Kota focuses on his political career for it conducts a vow to be calm & patient for 3 months. Knowing it, his opponent Ashok Kumar makes several attempts to destroy him but to avail. Parallelly, destiny makes the 3 air hostesses as buddies who schedule a get-together with their fiance. Being unbeknownst Jagapati reaches therein. On the verge to comes out of reality, Jagapati is abducted by Indraja and they consummate. At one time, Brahmanandam speaks volumes regarding air hostesses in a code language of aircraft. Overhearing it, CBI officers Mallikarjuna Rao & Leg misconstrue them as terrorists who are behind and join as servants in the house.

Meanwhile, AVS realizes the hoodwink of each of them, but fortuitously, he losses his memory and they turn him into a watchman. Further, Kota threshold successfully about to complete in a few minites. In that moment, he conscious that Indraja is pregnant, outburst and spoils the mission. Thus, he proceeds to seek vengeance against Jagapati. At the same time, Gauthami lands and kisses Prasad in confusion when he falls for her. Jagapati being aware first confronts Prasad but the next, he words to quit her for him. At this point, the 4 beauties get here, and the truth breaks out when they all flare up. At last, Jagapati tries to abscond getting a lift from Bombay Papa who apprehends him to Police. Finally, the movie ends with Prasad & Brahmanandam are also seized by CBI Officers.

Cast

 Jagapathi Babu as Jagapathi Babu
 Rajendra Prasad as Rajendra Prasad
 Ramya Krishna as Bombay Papa (Cameo appearance)
 Madhu Bala as Madhu
 Gautami as Gautami
 Kasthuri as Kasturi
 Indraja as Indraja
 Kota Srinivasa Rao as Cuddapah Kotaiah
 Brahmanandam as Broker Brahmanandam
 M. S. Narayana as Auto Driver
 Venu Madhav as Taxi Driver
 Chalapathi Rao as Inspector Chalapati
 A.V.S. as House Owner
 Mallikarjuna Rao as Mallikarjuna Rao
 Gundu Hanumantha Rao as Tea Seller Hanumantu
 Ironleg Sastri as Leg
 Junior Relangi as Watchman Relangi Ramana Reddy
 Jenny as pastor
 Y. Vijaya as Julie
 K. Ashok Kumar as Minister
 Jeeva as Jeeva
 Narsing Yadav as Kota's Henchman
 Kallu Krishna Rao as Sage
 E. V. V. Satyanarayana as himself (Cameo)

Soundtrack

The music for the film was composed by Koti, and released by the TA Sound Track Audio Company.

References

External links

1997 films
1990s Telugu-language films
Indian romantic comedy films
1997 romantic comedy films
Indian sex comedy films
Casual sex in films
Films directed by E. V. V. Satyanarayana
Films scored by Koti